Cape Wanbrow is a rocky headland overlooking Oamaru Harbour, New Zealand. Although it has been a commercial forestry area for a number of decades, the cape is now primarily a Council controlled reserve, and is gradually being replanted with native trees and shrubs. It has a network of walking tracks and mountain bike tracks, and is popular with the public.

Cape Wanbrow was an important lookout point during the Second World War and hosts a gun emplacement and remains of the original magazine which served the fortified gun. Below the cape on its north side is a protected area which is home to a blue penguin colony, and rare yellow eyed penguins are to the south of the cape.  New Zealand fur seals and occasionally elephant seals are found resting on the rocks.

References

External links 
 Cape Wanbrow defence battery
 Fossilised bird remains from the Cape

Oamaru
Wanbrow
Forts in New Zealand
Geography of Otago